Joanne Woolway Grenfell (born 27 May 1972) is a bishop of the Church of England serving as Bishop of Stepney, an area bishop of the Diocese of London, since 2019.

Early life and education
Grenfell was born on 27 May 1972. She was educated at Egglescliffe School, a comprehensive school in Eaglescliffe, County Durham. She studied at Oriel College, Oxford, graduating with a Bachelor of Arts (BA) degree in 1993. She then moved to Canada, where she studied English literature at the University of British Columbia: she graduated with a Master of Arts (MA) degree in 1994. She returned to Oriel to undertake a Doctor of Philosophy (DPhil) degree on the writing of Edmund Spenser. Her doctoral thesis was titled "Spenser and the culture of place", and her DPhil was awarded in 1997.

Grenfell was a lecturer in English Literature Oriel College, Oxford until 1998. She then trained for ordained ministry in the Church of England at Westcott House, Cambridge from 1998 until 2000.

Ordained ministry
She was ordained deacon (alongside her husband James Grenfell) in Liverpool Cathedral, at Petertide (2 July) 2000, by John Packer, Bishop of Ripon and Leeds (who had been Bishop of Warrington until shortly beforehand). They were both ordained priest the following Trinity Sunday (10 June 2001) by James Jones, Bishop of Liverpool, at Liverpool Cathedral.

Following a curacy in Kirkby in the Diocese of Liverpool, she was appointed Priest in charge in the Sheffield Manor ecumenical team ministry. Following this she was a Residentiary Canon at Sheffield Cathedral, Diocesan Director of Ordinands and Dean of Women's Ministry in the Diocese of Sheffield until her archidiaconal appointment in the Diocese of Portsmouth, being installed at a service at Portsmouth Cathedral on 14 April 2013, serving as Archdeacon of Portsdown until 2019.

Episcopal ministry
Her consecration as bishop, and start of her tenure as Bishop of Stepney, was on 3 July 2019 at St Paul's Cathedral; the principal consecrator was Justin Welby, Archbishop of Canterbury.

References

1972 births
Alumni of Oriel College, Oxford
Archdeacons of Portsdown
Bishops of Stepney
Women Anglican bishops
Living people
21st-century Church of England bishops